The Breath of Scandal is a 1922 novel by the American writer Edwin Balmer.

In 1924 it was adapted into a silent film of the same title directed by Louis J. Gasnier and starring Betty Blythe.

References

Bibliography
 Goble, Alan. The Complete Index to Literary Sources in Film. Walter de Gruyter, 1999.
 Smith, Geoffrey D. American Fiction, 1901-1925: A Bibliography. Cambridge University Press, 1997.

See also

1922 American novels
Novels by Edwin Balmer
American novels adapted into films